Petr Rikunov (born 24 February 1997 in Kovrov) is a Russian cyclist, who currently rides for UCI ProTeam .

Major results
2014
 1st  Road race, National Junior Road Championships
 6th Time trial, UEC European Junior Road Championships
2017
 National Under-23 Road Championships
1st  Road race
1st  Time trial
 4th Road race, UEC European Under–23 Road Championships
2019
 5th Time trial, National Road Championships
 2022
 (1st) Nart of Adygea

References

External links

1997 births
Living people
Russian male cyclists
Sportspeople from Nizhny Novgorod
21st-century Russian people